Wolica is a river of Poland, a tributary of the Wieprz south of Krasnystaw.

Rivers of Poland
Rivers of Lublin Voivodeship